Vivos, also known as The Vivos Group, is a California-based company founded by Robert Vicino is building hardened underground shelters designed to withstand future disasters and life-extinction catastrophes. Shelters  have been completed in Indiana, 575 bunkers each 2,150 square feet across a former military base in  South Dakota, and others are in the process of construction.   , Vicino noted that the company has approximately 100,000 members, of whom more than 1,000 have bought space in one or more of the Vivos shelters.

Locations

Indiana shelter

The first completed shelter, located in Indiana; was built during the Cold War to withstand a near direct-hit from a 20-megaton nuclear bomb. With accommodations for 80 people, the Indiana complex has a few spots left, due to member relocations, and family changes.

Vivos Europa One

Vivos plans to convert a surplus Cold War Soviet-built underground complex of  located in Rothenstein, Germany, into a luxury shelter to house up to 1,000 people, a small zoo, storage for cultural treasures, and a gene bank for reconstituting plants and animals after a possible extinction event. Fire safety regulations were expected to present a problem for the project requiring a fire sprinkler system throughout the facility.

Vivos xPoint, South Dakota
Each bunker is 80' x 26.5' capable of comfortably accommodating up to 24 people with a supply of food, water, fuel, and hygienic supplies for a year or more. A 99-year lease on a bunker costs $1,090 a year, plus a $45,000 deposit paid up-front. “xPoint” was coined as: "the Point in time that only the prepared will survive.”

Atchison, Kansas shelter
In 2013, Vivos acquired the purchase rights to a large portion of the Atchison Storage Facility, a  former limestone mine in Atchison, Kansas, formerly owned by the US Army, and announced plans to convert it into "the world's largest private underground survivor shelter", housing 5,000 people. In June 2014, Vivos cancelled the Kansas project due to Army geologists' concerns about the structural stability of the former limestone mine having experienced a number of dome out collapses of the limestone.

References

External links

Bunkers
Doomsday scenarios
Fortifications by type
Pole shift theory and theorists
Subterranea (geography)
Survivalism
United States civil defense